Weng Xinzhi (Chinese: 翁新芝; Pinyin: Wēng Xīnzhì; born June 15, 1988) is a Chinese football (soccer) player who competed in the 2008 Summer Olympics. She plays as a defender.

Weng played in the U-20's China team in 2004 and 2006 World Cups, and was promoted the senior Chinese team in 2007, when she played two matches during the team's qualifying campaign for the World Cup. Despite being picked for the finals, she did not make any appearances. Her first major tournament with the national squad in which she competed was the 2008 Summer Olympics, which were held in China.

References

External links
Profile at FIFA.com

1988 births
Living people
Chinese women's footballers
China women's international footballers
Olympic footballers of China
Footballers at the 2008 Summer Olympics
2007 FIFA Women's World Cup players
Women's association football defenders
Asian Games medalists in football
Footballers at the 2006 Asian Games
Footballers at the 2010 Asian Games
Asian Games bronze medalists for China
Medalists at the 2006 Asian Games